Phosphoenolpyruvate carboxykinase 1 (soluble), also known as PCK1, is an enzyme which in humans is encoded by the PCK1 gene.

Function

This enzyme is a main control point for the regulation of gluconeogenesis. The cytosolic enzyme encoded by this gene, along with GTP, catalyzes the formation of phosphoenolpyruvate from oxaloacetate, with the release of carbon dioxide and GDP. The expression of this gene can be regulated by insulin, glucocorticoids, glucagon, cAMP, and diet. A mitochondrial isozyme of the encoded protein also has been characterized.

Interactive pathway map

See also
PEPCK

References

Further reading